The 2019 NAIA Football National Championship was a four-round, sixteen team tournament played between November 23 and December 21, 2019. The tournament concluded with a single game, played as the 64th Annual NAIA Football National Championship.

The championship game was played at Eddie Robinson Stadium in Grambling, Louisiana, between the undefeated No. 2 Marian Knights, representing Marian University from Indianapolis, Indiana, and the undefeated No. 1 Morningside Mustangs, representing Morningside College from Sioux City, Iowa. This was the first time the championship game was played at this venue after the prior five games had been played at Municipal Stadium in Daytona Beach, Florida. The game was played on December 21, 2019, with kickoff at 7:00 p.m. EST (6:00 p.m. local CST) on ESPN3.

Teams

Marian
The Marian Knights, led by 7th-year head coach Mark Henninger, entered the national championship game as the #2 seed. They were seeking to win their third national championship, having won in 2012 and 2015. They entered the game 12–0, 8–0 in MSFA play.

Morningside
The Morningside Mustangs, led by 19th-year head coach Steve Ryan, entered the national championship game as the #1 seed and the defending champions, having won their first national championship the year prior. They entered the game 13–0, 9–0 in GPAC play.

Series history

Game summary

Statistics

Postseason playoffs
A total of sixteen teams were selected to participate in the single-elimination tournament from across the country, with invitations that were revealed on Sunday, November 17, 2019.  The field included twelve conference champions who received automatic bids. The field was then filled with at-large selections that were awarded to the highest ranked teams that were not conference champions. First-round seedings were based on the final regular-season edition of the 2019 NAIA Coaches' Poll, with certain minor modifications given based on travel and geographic considerations.  Each subsequent round also saw minor modifications based on travel and the geography of the remaining teams.

Quarterfinal pairings were announced by the NAIA on November 23, after the first round results were known.

Semifinal pairings were announced by the NAIA on November 30, soon after completion of the day's quarterfinal games.

References

NAIA Football National Championship
Morningside Mustangs football
Marian Knights football
Sports in Grambling, Louisiana
December 2019 sports events in the United States
2019 in sports in Louisiana